Lynn Saville (born 1950) is an American photographer of night time urban landscapes.

Early life and education
Saville was born in Durham, North Carolina.

She received a Bachelor of Arts degree from Duke University, and a Master's in Fine Art from Pratt Institute, New York.

Life an work
Saville is primarily known for her night photographs of urban landscapes. Her subjects include streets and buildings in the New York area. She has described these nocturnal city scenes as: "an empty skeletal set where lights and shadows showcase an uninterrupted dance." Geoff Dyer described her work for The New Yorker magazine as "the archeology of overnight: resting tools, tired steps, dreaming brooms, sleeping shadows" through scenes that convey a sense of emptiness and vacancy.

She has taught at the International Center of Photography.

Exhibitions
In 2015, Saville had a solo exhibition at the Pratt Institute gallery in Brooklyn, New York. In 2017, Saville had a one-person show at the Griffin Museum of Photography.

Publications

 Horses in the Circus Ring. Dutton Books for Young Readers, 1989. .
 The Language of Life. Bill Moyers, 1995.
 Acquainted with the Night. Rizzoli, 1997.
 Night/Shift: Color Photographs by Lynn Saville. Monacelli/Random House, 2009. .
 Dark City: Urban America at Night, Photographs by Lynn Saville. Bologna: Damiani, 2015.
 New York, Photographs by Lynn Saville. Long Island City: Kris Graves, 2018.

Collections
Her work is included in the permanent collections of the Mint Museum, the Museum of Fine Arts Houston, the Los Angeles County Museum of Art and the Brooklyn Museum of Art.

Her archives are held at the David M. Rubenstein Rare Book & Manuscript Library at Duke University.

References

External links

Living people
1950 births
20th-century American photographers
21st-century American photographers
20th-century American women artists
21st-century American women artists